General Sir Charles Hotham-Thompson, 8th Baronet (18 June 1729 – 25 January 1794) was a British Army officer and Member of Parliament.

He was the eldest son of Sir Beaumont Hotham, 7th Bt., of Beverley, in the East Riding of Yorkshire. He was educated at Westminster School (1741–5) and studied law at the Middle Temple (1742). He was commissioned into the Army as an ensign in the 1st Foot Guards in 1746.

He served with the regiment in Flanders, where he took part in the Battle of Lauffeld in 1747 and was appointed aide-de-camp to the Earl of Albemarle, commander of the British forces in the Low Countries. During the Seven Years' War (1754–63) he was firstly aide-de-camp to Lord Ligonier and then adjutant to the British forces fighting on the continent. He was promoted to colonel in 1762 and given the colonelcy of the 63rd (West Suffolk) Regiment of Foot in 1765.

From 1761 to 1768 he was also the Member of Parliament for St Ives and in 1763 was made a Groom of the Bedchamber.

In 1768 he transferred as colonel to the 15th Regiment of Foot and retired to Yorkshire, where he succeeded his father in 1771 to the baronetcy and his estate near Beverley. He took the additional name of Thompson on inheriting the Thompson estates in Yorkshire from his wife's family in 1772 (reverting to Hotham in 1787) and commissioned Thomas Atkinson of York to rebuild Dalton Hall between 1771 and 1775. He was knighted KB in 1772.

Promoted Major-General in 1772, he retired from the Army in 1775, was gazetted full general (as Sir Charles Thompson, Bt) in 1793  and died at Dalton Hall in 1794. He had married Lady Dorothy Hobart, the daughter of John Hobart, 1st Earl of Buckinghamshire, and had one daughter. He was succeeded as baronet by his brother Sir John Hotham, 9th Baronet.

References

 
 
 

1729 births
1794 deaths
People from Beverley
People educated at Westminster School, London
Members of the Middle Temple
British Army generals
Knights Companion of the Order of the Bath
Members of the Parliament of Great Britain for St Ives
British MPs 1761–1768
Baronets in the Baronetage of England